Mian Rud Ab (also Romanized as Mīān Rūd Āb; also known as Mīān Ābrūd) is a village in Kiskan Rural District, in the Central District of Baft County, Kerman Province, Iran. At the 2006 census, its population was 112, in 34 families.

References 

Populated places in Baft County